Kirovsky is a rural locality (a settlement) and the administrative center of Kirovsky Selsoviet, Loktevsky District, Altai Krai, Russia. The population was 1,062 as of 2013. There are 15 streets.

Geography 
Kirovsky is located on the Zolotukha River, 4 km northeast of Gornyak (the district's administrative centre) by road. Izvestkovy is the nearest rural locality.

References 

Rural localities in Loktevsky District